The discography of CMX starts in 1985 and continues to this day. During this time, the band has released fifteen studio albums, two box set compilations, 20 top ten singles on the Finnish charts (seven of which have topped the charts), four EPs, and a DVD.

Albums

Studio albums 

Translations by Tero Valkonen.

Compilations

EPs

Singles 

"Vapaus johtaa kansaa" was recorded together with Kotiteollisuus and 51Koodia.

Cassette demos 
Raiskattu lastulevy (transl. Raped chipboard) (1985) - done with a vague lineup
Demo (1985) - the lineup came the same that in Johannes Kastaja and Raivo EPs and Kolmikärki album
Pohjolan Valkeus (transl. Whiteness of the North) (1986)
Johannes Kastaja (transl. John the Baptist) (1987) - includes two new songs, one which lyrics differ a little from previous version, two with same music but completely different lyrics than in the previous demos and six which are recorded again but don't differ a much from previous versions

Other 
CMX DVD (2001)
Tuuliajolla 2006 (2006) -- DVD, various artists
"Punainen komentaja" (2007) - animation based on the Talvikuningas storyline and part VIII "Punainen komentaja".

References 

Discography
Discographies of Finnish artists
Punk rock group discographies